Skinny is the debut novel by Hungarian-Canadian author Ibi Kaslik, first published by HarperCollins in May 2004. It appeared on the New York Times best sellers list for two consecutive weeks in 2008.

Summary
Holly's older sister, Giselle, is self-destructing. Haunted by her love-deprived relationship with her late father, this once strong role model and medical student, is gripped by anorexia. Holly, a track star, struggles to keep her own life in balance while coping with the mental and physical deterioration of her beloved sister. Together, they can feel themselves slipping and are holding on for dear life.

References

2004 Canadian novels
HarperCollins books
Anorexia nervosa
Novels about eating disorders
2004 debut novels